Casados is a Spanish surname either meaning married (plural) or from a homonymous farmstead.

Notable people with this surname include:
 Eloy Casados (born 1949), American actor
 René Casados (born 1961), Mexican actor

See also
 Casado (surname)

References